Hanne Heuch (born 1 June 1954) is a Norwegian ceramist.

She was born in Oslo, and is the great-granddaughter of bishop Johan Christian Heuch. She took her education at the Norwegian National Academy of Crafts and Design (now a part of the Bergen National Academy of the Arts) and Norwegian National Academy of Craft and Art Industry. She was a professor at the Academy of Crafts and Design from 1988 to 1994, and is among Norway's foremost ceramists.

References

1954 births
Living people
Norwegian artists
Norwegian women artists
Bergen Academy of Art and Design alumni
Oslo National Academy of the Arts alumni
Academic staff of the Bergen Academy of Art and Design
Artists from Oslo
Norwegian women academics